Shaare Zedek ( "Gates of Righteousness"), also spelled Shaarei/Shaaray/Shaarey, Sedek/Tsedec/Tsedek/Tzedec/Tzedek, may refer to:

Canada
Congregation Shaarey Zedek, an Orthodox synagogue in Windsor, Ontario
Shaare Zedek Congregation, a Conservative synagogue in Montreal
Shaarei Tzedec,  an Orthodox synagogue in Toronto
Shaarey Zedek Synagogue, a Conservative synagogue in Winnipeg 
Shaarey Zedek Cemetery, a Jewish cemetery in Winnipeg

Colombia
 Sinagoga Shaare Sedek, an Orthodox synagogue in Barranquilla

Israel
Shaare Zedek Medical Center, a major hospital in Jerusalem
Shaare Zedek Cemetery, a small Jewish cemetery in Jerusalem

United Kingdom
 Sha'arei Tsedek: North London Reform Synagogue, a Reform synagogue in London

United States
Congregation Shaare Zedek, a Conservative Jewish synagogue in Manhattan
Congregation Shaare Zedek Cemetery, a Jewish cemetery in Manhattan
Congregation Shaarey Zedek, a Conservative Jewish synagogue in Southfield, Michigan
Shaare Zedek Synagogue, a former synagogue in St. Louis, Missouri
Shaari Zedek Synagogue, a historic synagogue in Brooklyn, New York